The Constitutional Nationalist Party – Union for Integration and Resurgence (PNC–UNIR), often known by the shortened name UNIR Constitutional Nationalist Party or simply UNIR Party, is a conservative political party in Argentina founded in 1982 by Alberto Asseff, a former member of the Radical Civic Union. It is currently part of the Juntos por el Cambio coalition, and Asseff sits in the Argentine Chamber of Deputies since 2019 representing Buenos Aires Province. For most of its history it has supported Peronist candidates and alliances.

References

External links
Official website 

Political parties established in 1982
1982 establishments in Argentina
Right-wing parties in Argentina
Conservative parties in Argentina
Peronist parties and alliances in Argentina